Santiago María Ramírez Ruíz de Dulanto (Samiano, Burgos, 25 July 1891 – Salamanca, 18 December 1967) was a Dominican friar, priest, professor of philosophy and theology, and noted 20th century Thomist. He participated in the Second Vatican Council as a peritus.

Life
Ramírez was born in 1891 into a family of farmers and entered the major Catholic seminary in Logroño. He subsequently left to enter the Order of Preachers in 1911. His novitiate took place in Corias, Asturias, and he received the tonsure in 1914. After completing his studies at the Pontifical University of Saint Thomas Aquinas (also known as the Angelicum) in Rome, he was ordained a priest on 16 July 1916. He subsequently taught theology and philosophy at the Convent of San Esteban, Salamanca, at the University of Freiburg, and at the "Luis Vives" Institute of Philosophy.

In 1949, he traveled to the United States to attend the Dominican General Chapter, held at the Dominican House of Studies in Washington, DC., where he served on the Chapter's Commission pertaining to Study (De Studiis).

In 1960, he was appointed as a member of the Preparatory Commission for the Second Vatican Council. He was subsequently named a peritus for the Council's Theological Commission.

He died in 1967 and was buried in the Convent of San Esteban in the so-called "Pantheon of Theologians" alongside other noted theologians, including Melchor Cano, Francisco de Vitoria, and Domingo de Soto.

References

External links
Santiago María Ramírez Dulanto at Real Academia de la Historia by Ramón Hernández Martín, OP (in Spanish)

Spanish Dominicans

Thomists

1891 births
1967 deaths
People from the Province of Burgos
Participants in the Second Vatican Council
Pontifical University of Saint Thomas Aquinas alumni
Academic staff of the University of Freiburg